Aflame in the Sky is a 1927 American silent adventure film directed by J.P. McGowan and starring Sharon Lynn, Jack Luden and William Humphrey.

Cast
 Sharon Lynn as Inez Carillo 
 Jack Luden as Terry Owen 
 William Humphrey as Major Savage
 Robert McKim as Joseph Murdoch 
 William Scott as Saunders 
 Charles A. Stevenson as Grandfather 
 Billy Franey as Cookie 
 Mark Hamilton as Slim 
 Walter Ackerman as Desert Rat
 Jane Keckley as Cordelia Murdoch

References

Bibliography
 John J. McGowan. J.P. McGowan: Biography of a Hollywood Pioneer. McFarland, 2005.

External links

1927 films
1927 adventure films
American adventure films
Films directed by J. P. McGowan
American silent feature films
1920s English-language films
Film Booking Offices of America films
American black-and-white films
Films based on works by Mary Roberts Rinehart
1920s American films
Silent adventure films